The 2021 Exeter City Council election took place on 6 May 2021 to elect the members of Exeter City Council in Devon, England. This was on the same day as other local elections.  Two candidates were elected to the Mincinglake and Whipton ward due to a by-election taking place the same day following the death of a Councillor some months earlier.

Results summary

Ward results

Alphington

Duryard and St. James

Exwick

Heavitree

Mincinglake and Whipton

Newtown and St. Leonard's

Pennsylvania

Pinhoe

Priory

St. David's

St. Loye's

St. Thomas

Topsham

References

Exeter
2021
2020s in Exeter
May 2021 events in the United Kingdom